Wizzy & Woppy is a Flemish children's television show produced by Studio 100, centered on four animal friends who live together in a pet store.

The show premiered on August 30, 1999, and the final episode was broadcast in   2007. The show was broadcast in Flanders and the Netherlands.

Characters 
 Wizzy (portrayed by Barbara De Jonge) is a mouse. She's a bit naughty, but she can be very sweet. She shares a cage with Woppy.
 Woppy (portrayed by Carl Ridders) is a mouse. He's naughty and likes to prank his friends. He shares a cage with Wizzy.
 Dongo (portrayed by Dirk Bosschaert) is a tortoise. He's very lazy and sleeps most of the time. He's also very dumb and naive. 
 Kasha (portrayed by Hans Van Cauwenberghe) is a parrot. He's very smart and likes to read the newspaper to pass time.

Belgian children's television shows
1990s Belgian television series
1999 Belgian television series debuts
2007 Belgian television series endings
Television shows adapted into comics
Television duos
Television series about mice and rats
Television series about birds
Television series about turtles